"One in a Million" is a single release by British electronic production group Drumsound & Bassline Smith, featuring vocals from Fleur East. The song was released on 21 April 2013. The song has peaked to number 53 on the UK Singles Chart and number 14 on the UK Dance Chart.

Music video
A music video to accompany the release of "One in a Million" was first released onto YouTube on 27 March 2013 at a total length of three minutes and seven seconds. As of March 2016 it has received more than 740,000 views.

Track listing

Chart performance

Weekly charts

Release history

References

2013 singles
Drumsound & Bassline Smith songs
2013 songs